Meenambakkam Railway Station is one of the railway stations of the Chennai Beach–Chengalpet section of the Chennai Suburban Railway Network. It serves the neighbourhood of Meenambakkam, a suburb of Chennai.

History
The station lies in the Chennai Beach–Tambaram section of the Chennai Suburban Railway Network, the first suburban section of the city. With the completion of track-lying work in March 1931, which began in 1928, the suburban services were started on 11 May 1931 between Beach and Tambaram, and was electrified on 15 November 1931, with the first MG EMU services running on 1.5 kV DC. The section was converted to 25 kV AC traction on 15 January 1967.

See also

 Chennai Suburban Railway
 Railway stations in Chennai

References

External links
 Local Train timings from/to Meenambakkam

Stations of Chennai Suburban Railway
Railway stations in Chennai
Railway stations in Kanchipuram district